Orthoporus texicolens is a species of millipede in the family Spirostreptidae. It is found in Central America and North America.

References

Further reading

 

Spirostreptida
Articles created by Qbugbot
Animals described in 1938